Angel Arroyo Lanchas (born 2 August 1956 in El Barraco) is a Spanish former professional road bicycle racer. In the 1983 Tour de France, Arroyo won one stage and finished 2nd place in the general classification.

In stage 17 of the 1982 Vuelta a España, while leading the race, Arroyo was tested positive for Methylphenidate, and got a 10 minutes time penalty. This effectively stripped him of victory and put him back in 13th place.

Major results

1977
Tour of Ireland
1979
Vuelta a los Valles Mineros
1980
Clásica a los Puertos de Guadarrama
Vuelta a Castilla
1981
Vuelta a España:
Winner stage 18
6th place overall classification
Vuelta a Asturias
1982
Vuelta a España:
Winner stage 15B
Subida a Arrate
Sierra Madrid
Memoria Santi Andia
1983
Tour de France:
Winner stage 15
2nd place overall classification
1984
Tour de France:
Winner stage 19
6th place overall classification
1986
GP San Froilan Lugo

See also
 List of doping cases in cycling

References

External links 

Spanish male cyclists
1956 births
Living people
Spanish Tour de France stage winners
Spanish Vuelta a España stage winners
Doping cases in cycling
Spanish sportspeople in doping cases
Sportspeople from the Province of Ávila
Cyclists from Castile and León